The Pavilion is a house on Oxley Hill, near Orchard Road in Singapore. The Pavilion served as Government House between 1859 and 1861, after Raffles House was demolished to make way for a fort. The street address of the site is 5 Oxley Rise, Singapore. The Pavilion's prominent site on the top of the hill allows it to overlook Lee Kuan Yew's house at 38 Oxley Road.

History

Oxley Estate  
The Pavilion was built around 1847 at Dr Thomas Oxley's nutmeg estate. It was one of five houses Oxley built at a hill that came to be called Oxley's Hill - Pavilion, Bargany House, Bargany Lodge, Killiney House and Killiney Bungalow.  Another version has it that it was built by George Garden Nicol. The Pavilion was one of two houses in his estate that Oxley used as his residence. The other was Killiney House.  The Pavilion was sited at the top of Oxley's Hill. Oxley was Surgeon of the Straits Settlements.

Government House (1859-1861) 
In 1856, the house was sold to Friedrich Albert Schreiber. Schreiber was a partner in the German trading firm of Behn, Meyer and Co. 

In 1859, the governor's residence at Raffles House on Government Hill was demolished to make way for a fort. Government House was temporarily moved to the Pavilion. At the time, Schreiber, the owner of the Pavilion, was away in Europe. “The 24th current, being the anniversary of Her Majesty’s birth, was observed as a Holiday, and at noon the usual salutes were fired in the roads and on shore. In the Evening His Honor the Governor entertained a numerous party at a Ball and Supper, in the Pavilion, the elegant residence of Mr Schreiber, which His Honor at present occupies as the temporary Government House.”

The Singapore Free Press and Mercantile Advertiser. 26 May 1859.
The lease for the Pavilion expired in 1861 and Government House was moved to new leased premises at Leonie Hill and Leonie Cottage.“We are informed that the lease of Dr. Oxley’s house for the Governor’s residence having expired, the Government have rented the splendid residence of T.H. Campbell, Esquire, as a Government House."

The Straits Times. 1 June 1861.

Later years 
Prominent Armenian businessman Catchick Moses bought the Pavilion in 1874 and made it his residence. Moses is remembered for having started the Straits Times. Moses was well respected, and local residents used to go to him at the Pavilion for advice and to settle differences. 

After Moses' death in 1892, his family continued to occupy the Pavilion until it was sold by public auction in 1918 to Manasseh Meyer for Straits $147,000. The Pavilion was then converted into a private residential hotel.

The Mysterious Case of Yoshio Nishimura 
In the 1920s - 1930s, the property was leased to Ishihara Sangyo Koshi (ISK). ISK was a major Japanese mining concern operating iron mines in Malaya. Yoshio Nishimura, managing director of ISK and president of the Japanese Association, resided at the property. In December 1934, Nishimura was called in for questioning by Special Branch. He died shortly after arriving at police headquarters due to strychnine poisoning. His sudden death caused a sensation in the local Japanese community. There was considerable media attention, with suspicions about espionage. An open verdict was eventually returned. Nishimura is buried at the Japanese Cemetery. Recently declassified documents reveal that Nishimura was the target of a colonial police counter espionage operation.

Present
The present house on the site, possibly constructed by Meyer in the 1920s, is privately occupied.

References 

Government Houses of the British Empire and Commonwealth
Houses in Singapore